Trn may refer to:

Geography

Trn, Široki Brijeg, a village in Široki Brijeg municipality, Bosnia and Herzegovina
Trn, Velika Kladuša, a village in Velika Kladuša municipality, Bosnia and Herzegovina
Tran, Bulgaria, a town in Bulgaria
Trn, Croatia, a village in the municipality of Slivno, Croatia
Trn, North Macedonia, a village in Bitola municipality, North Macedonia
Trn (Kuršumlija), a village in Kuršumlija municipality, Serbia

Other
The trn newsreader, a threading variant of rn

See also
 TRN (disambiguation)